The 2013 PGA Tour was the 98th season of the U.S.-based golf tour, and the 46th since separating from the PGA of America. The season began on January 4, 2013.

The season ran from January to September, the shorter-than-usual schedule aiding in the transition from the long-running January–December schedule to the new wraparound October–September schedule. It was the last season to be held entirely in one calendar year; the 2013–14 season would begin in October 2013.

Schedule
The following table lists official events during the 2013 season.

Unofficial events
The following events were sanctioned by the PGA Tour, but did not carry FedEx Cup points or official money, nor were wins official.

Location of tournaments

Money leaders
The money list was based on prize money won during the season, calculated in U.S. dollars.

Awards

See also
2013 European Tour
2013 Web.com Tour
2013 Champions Tour

Notes

References

External links

2013 PGA Tour at ESPN

PGA Tour seasons
PGA Tour